HMS Europa was a Royal Navy Shore establishment active between 1939 and 1946 during World War II as the central depot for the Royal Naval Patrol Service (RNPS). It was established after the commandeering of Sparrows Nest Gardens, a private residence in Lowestoft in Suffolk. Originally named Pembroke X, the base was the headquarters of the RNPS, responsible for protecting coastal Britain and its convoys, in particular undertaking minesweeping duties. Over 70,000 men and 6,000 vessels, many of them small civilian vessels such as armed trawlers, served in the RNPS during the war.

The base was decommissioned in 1946. It is now the site of Lowestoft War Memorial Museum.

References

Bibliography
Warlow, Ben, Shore Establishments of the Royal Navy, Liskeard : Maritime, 2000.

External links
The Wartimes Memories Project
Imperial War Museum

Royal Navy bases in England
Royal Navy shore establishments
Military installations established in 1939
Military installations closed in 1946
History of Suffolk